The 2022 United States House of Representatives elections in Maine were held on November 8, 2022, to elect the two U.S. representatives from the state of Maine, one from each of the state's two congressional districts. The elections coincided with other elections to the House of Representatives, elections to the United States Senate and various state and local elections. The elections will be conducted with ranked choice voting, as per the result of a referendum passed in 2016. These were the first House of Representatives elections held in Maine following the 2020 redistricting cycle.

Results summary

Statewide

District
Results of the 2022 United States House of Representatives elections in Maine by district:

District 1

Before redistricting, the 1st district encompassed the southern coastal area of the state, taking in Portland, Augusta, Brunswick and Saco. The incumbent is Democrat Chellie Pingree, who was re-elected with 62.2% of the vote in 2020.

Democratic primary

Candidates

Nominee
Chellie Pingree, incumbent U.S. Representative

Endorsements

Results

Republican primary

Candidates

Nominee
Ed Thelander, retired Navy SEAL

Results

General election

Predictions

Polling
Graphical summary

Generic Democrat vs. generic Republican

Results

District 2

Before redistricting, the 2nd district covered most of northern rural Maine, including the cities of Lewiston, Bangor, Auburn and Presque Isle. The incumbent is Democrat Jared Golden, who was re-elected with 53.0% of the vote in 2020. Donald Trump won the district in the concurrent presidential election with 52.3% of the vote.

Democratic primary

Candidates

Nominee
Jared Golden, incumbent U.S. Representative

Did not file
 Michael Sutton, travel agent and candidate for Maine House of Representatives in 2020

Endorsements

Results

Republican primary

Candidates

Nominee
Bruce Poliquin, former U.S. Representative from

Eliminated in primary
Liz Caruso, Caratunk first selectman

Withdrew
Mike Perkins, state representative
Peggy Sheriff, member of the Greater Bangor Apartment Owners and Managers Association
Trey Stewart, state senator (endorsed Poliquin)

Declined
Dale Crafts, former state representative and nominee for this district in 2020

Endorsements

Results

Independents

Candidates

Declared
Tiffany Bond, family attorney, candidate for this district in 2018, and write-in candidate for U.S. Senate in 2020

Disqualified/Withdrawn 
Jordan Borrowman, janitor

General election

Predictions

Polling
Graphical summary

Generic Democrat vs. generic Republican

Results

% (gross) = percent of all valid votes cast (without eliminating the exhausted votes)

% (net) = percent of votes cast after eliminating the exhausted votes

Notes

Partisan clients

References

External links
 Elections & Voting division of the Maine Secretary of State
 
 
  (State affiliate of the U.S. League of Women Voters)
 

Official campaign websites for 1st district candidates
 Chellie Pingree (D) for Congress
 Ed Thelander (R) for Congress

Official campaign websites for 2nd district candidates
 Jared Golden (D) for Congress
 Bruce Poliquin (R) for Congress

2022
Maine
United States House of Representatives